The Allen-Beville House is a historic house on the Little Neck peninsula in the Douglaston neighborhood of Queens, New York City. Constructed between 1848 and 1850, it is one of the few surviving 19th century structures in Queens built as a farmhouse that survives.

The site was inherited by Daniel K. Allen from his uncle, Richard Allen. In 1847, Benjamin Allen acquired the site and built the house.

In the late 19th century, William P. Douglas, for whom Douglaston was named, purchased the home for use as a guest home for his estate, which was the original Douglaston Club building. When the clubhouse burned in 1917, the architects used this house as a model to create the current club.

In 1905-06 the Douglas Manor Company bought the Douglas Estate and subdivided the land as a real estate development.

The Allen-Beville House was given landmark status by the New York City Landmarks Preservation Commission in 1977 and was added to the National Register of Historic Places in 1983.

See also
List of New York City Designated Landmarks in Queens
National Register of Historic Places listings in Queens County, New York

References

Houses on the National Register of Historic Places in Queens, New York
Italianate architecture in New York (state)
Houses completed in 1850
New York City Designated Landmarks in Queens, New York
Douglaston–Little Neck, Queens